Karim Ahmadi (born January 5, 1986) is an Iranian midfielder who currently plays for Iranian football club Siah Jamegan in the Iran Pro League.

References

1986 births
Living people
Shahr Khodro F.C. players
Association football forwards
Iranian footballers
People from Arak, Iran